Butyrophilin-like protein 2 is a protein that in humans is encoded by the BTNL2 gene.

Because it is associated with the immune system and the major histocompatibility complex, it has been implicated in many diseases (see further reading list below). A large scale study found it to be the protein under the most stringent selection in the human genome in 8 out of 12 geographic regions using the HKA test.

References

External links

Further reading